Harrison Newey (born 25 July 1998) is a British racing driver and the son of Formula One engineer Adrian Newey. He made his ADAC Formula 4 debut in 2015 with Van Amersfoort Racing. He also competed in the BRDC Formula 4 Championship alongside his ADAC F4 campaign.

Racing record

Career summary

† As Newey was a guest driver, he was ineligible for points.‡ Team standings.

Complete FIA Formula 3 European Championship results
(key) (Races in bold indicate pole position) (Races in italics indicate fastest lap)

Complete European Le Mans Series results

‡ Half points awarded as less than 75% of race distance was completed.
† As Newey was a guest driver, he was ineligible for points.

24 Hours of Le Mans results

Complete Super Formula results
(key) (Races in bold indicate pole position) (Races in italics indicate fastest lap)

Complete British GT Championship results
(key) (Races in bold indicate pole position) (Races in italics indicate fastest lap)

Complete IMSA WeatherTech SportsCar Championship results
(key) (Races in bold indicate pole position; races in italics indicate fastest lap)

† Points only counted towards the Michelin Endurance Cup, and not the overall LMP2 Championship.

Complete Deutsche Tourenwagen Masters results
(key) (Races in bold indicate pole position; races in italics indicate fastest lap)

References

External links
 
 

1998 births
Living people
British racing drivers
French F4 Championship drivers
ADAC Formula 4 drivers
BRDC British Formula 3 Championship drivers
MRF Challenge Formula 2000 Championship drivers
FIA Formula 3 European Championship drivers
24 Hours of Le Mans drivers
Auto Sport Academy drivers
Asian Le Mans Series drivers
European Le Mans Series drivers
WeatherTech SportsCar Championship drivers
Deutsche Tourenwagen Masters drivers
Super Formula drivers
Japanese Formula 3 Championship drivers
British GT Championship drivers
Van Amersfoort Racing drivers
Rebellion Racing drivers
SMP Racing drivers
Motopark Academy drivers
Carlin racing drivers
Multimatic Motorsports drivers
W Racing Team drivers
DragonSpeed drivers
AF Corse drivers
Australian Endurance Championship drivers
Audi Sport drivers
Jota Sport drivers
B-Max Racing drivers